The 1978 Scheldeprijs was the 65th edition of the Scheldeprijs cycle race and was held on 1 August 1978. The race was won by Dietrich Thurau.

General classification

References

1978
1978 in road cycling
1978 in Belgian sport